Lucas Machado Solari (born 10 April 1998) is a Uruguayan footballer who plays as a goalkeeper for Club Atlético Rentistas in the Uruguayan Primera División.

References

External links
 

1998 births
Living people
Uruguayan footballers
Association football goalkeepers
Club Atlético River Plate (Montevideo) players
Uruguayan Primera División players
People from San José de Mayo